Juzefas Jurgelevičius (1947 – 23 November 2009) was a former football player from Lithuania.

Jurgelevičius was elected Lithuanian Footballer of the Year in 1969 and 1980.

References 

1947 births
2009 deaths
Lithuanian footballers
FK Žalgiris players
FC Dinamo Minsk players
Soviet footballers
Lithuanian people of Polish descent
Association footballers not categorized by position